Bebek (also Bubek) is the name of an ancient Hungarian noble family. The history of this family is connected with the areas in present-day Slovakia, notably in Gemer region, where they had their dominion.

History 
The first mention of this family is from the year 1243, when the king Béla IV of Hungary after the Mongol invasion donated domains at upper Gemer to brothers Derek and Philip. Both Slovak and Hungarian historians consider these brothers as members gens (clan) Ákos.

In the year 1318, descendants of Derek and Philip divided their heritage. Family had divided in two lines: Bebek de Pelsőc and Bebek de Csetnek branches, after the centre of their lands (present-day Plešivec and Štítnik, respectively).

Pelsőc (Plešivec) had become the centre of Bebek family. Dominic Bebek decided to build here a castle, and along with the castle, he had built Gothic Church of St. George, which was mentioned for the first time in 1314. In the early 15th century, Gothic funeral chapel was built next to the church, but only one member of the family is buried in it: Ladislaus Bebek.

In the 14th century, construction of Krásna Hôrka Castle started. The Bebek family was the owner of this castle from its construction until 1566, with the exception of short time, when it has been owned by the Máriássy family. After the Bebeks engaged in the conflict with the Emperor, castle in Plešivec was destroyed and Krásna Hôrka Castle was taken from the family. George Bebek had retreated to Transylvania, where he died in 1567, without descendants. The Bebek family have died out.

Name 
Two variants of name of this family exist: Bubek and Bebek. Nowadays, in Slovak historiography, both variants are used, but Bebek is more common, in Hungarian historiography, variant Bebek is used almost exclusively.

However, in medieval sources, variant Bubek predominates, it is used in most of charters, as well as on tombstone of George Bebek (created around 1390) and on tombstone of Ladislaus Bebek from 1401.

Coat of arms 
The coat of arms of the Bebek family is formed by the silver patriarchal cross, which is placed in the red early Gothic shield. On the top of the cross are placed golden bird feathers. The coat of arms of the Bebek family was evolving and different variants of it exist. On some depictions bars of cross have same length, on some depictions lower bar is longer. Usage of silver patriarchal cross, symbol of ruling Arpád family testifies about close relations to the ruling Árpád dynasty. Heraldic crest of the family is a crowned girl with two fish, which is interpreted as Melusine.

Dominions

Literature 

 TIHÁNYOVÁ, Monika. Bubekovci z Plešivca. Úspechy a pády jedného rodu v politike a umení. O. Z. Georgius Bubek, 2017, 152 s., .
 TIHÁNYOVÁ, Monika. Páni zo Štítnika. Putovanie kultúrnymi a hospodárskymi dejinami horného Gemera. O. Z. Georgius Bubek, 2020, 240 s.

Notes 

 
Hungarian noble families